ICTHus.EQ is a Christian music video program that airs on New Evangelization Television. ICTHus.EQ first aired on The Prayer Channel in 2007, which eventually became NET. Currently, the fourth season of ICTHus.EQ is slated to air in the spring of 2010. Each episode the host, Mari White, shows the latest and greatest in Christian music, often interviewing a musical group at the end of each episode. In previous seasons ICTHus.EQ has interviewed Rilent K, Angelina, Popple, Superchick and many others.

References

Local music television shows in the United States
Christian entertainment television series
2000s American music television series
2010s American music television series
2009 American television series debuts